The AEG B.II was a two-seat biplane reconnaissance aircraft produced in small numbers from 1914. It was a slightly smaller version of the B.I and proved more successful. They were used in limited numbers throughout 1914 to 1915, but were quickly replaced, as they were often derided for lack of speed and armament.

Operators

Luftstreitkräfte

Specifications (AEG B.II)

See also

References

External links

AEG B.II at the Virtual Aviation Museum

Biplanes
Single-engined tractor aircraft
1910s German military reconnaissance aircraft
B.II
Aircraft first flown in 1914